Jordan Roberts may refer to:

Jordan Roberts (footballer, born 1993), English footballer 
Jordan Roberts (footballer, born 1994), English footballer
Jordan Roberts (writer), screenwriter of Big Hero 6
Jordan Roberts (American football), American football running back